George Law (13 December 1885 – 9 September 1969) was a Scottish footballer who played as a right back.

He began his career at local club Arbroath and moved to Rangers in 1907. Law became a favourite among the Ibrox fans for his determined, hard-tackling defensive style. Playing during the William Wilton era, he won a Scottish league championship medal in 1911, one Glasgow Cup, and two Glasgow Merchants Charity Cups. He never won a Scottish Cup, but did play in the abandoned 1909 Scottish Cup Final.

Law left Rangers and moved to Leeds City in 1912. During World War I he returned to Glasgow to work at shipyards on the River Clyde, signing again for Rangers and spending a short time on loan with Partick Thistle. He returned to part-time Arbroath in the early 1920s. After retirement from football, he went into the motor engineering business.

References

External links

London Hearts profile

1885 births
1969 deaths
Scotland international footballers
Rangers F.C. players
Arbroath F.C. players
Leeds City F.C. players
Partick Thistle F.C. players
Scottish footballers
Association football fullbacks
Scottish Football League players
English Football League players
People from Arbroath
Footballers from Angus, Scotland